Darreh-ye Kuh Surag (also Romanized as Darreh-ye Kūh Sūrag) is a village in Qilab Rural District, Alvar-e Garmsiri District, Andimeshk County, Khuzestan Province, Iran. At the 2006 census, its population was 27, in 5 families.

References 

Populated places in Andimeshk County